Jim Vickers-Willis (16 July 191830 December 2008) was a popular Australian journalist and square dance caller in the 1950s. He was also an author of a best selling book and a campaigner for social change.

Biography

The son of John Vickers-Willis by his second wife Mildred Amelia, the daughter of journalist Horace Whitcomb, James Vickers-Willis was born in Mill Hill, England, and migrated to Australia with his parents at the age of seven.  He was educated in Melbourne at Brighton Grammar School and Haileybury after the family moved to Australia in 1925. He had an elder sister and a younger brother, as well as two older half-brothers from his father's first marriage.

He worked as a cadet journalist for the Sun Herald, Melbourne, and during World War II served as an RAAF instructor and Spitfire pilot. Embarking on a new career, he became the most popular square-dance caller of the day, and at one stage one of Australia's highest paid entertainers.  At the age of 36 he contracted polio. This ended his career as a square dance caller and this signalled the end of the square dance boom. The doctors gave him around 5 to 10 years to live but he defied medical opinion and lived for another 50 plus years.

In addition to being a square dance caller he was also an avid nudist. Vickers-Willis and his wife Beth (née Parkinson) were regulars at the River Valley Nudist Holiday Resort near Echuca.

He was an Australian Senate candidate in 1967.

Later years
Along with his wife Beth, he was featured in Episode 16 (2) on ABC in a broadcast of Retirement Home having been interviewed by ABC reporter Alex Tarney.
He died aged 90.

Organisations and memberships
 Quality Of Life Association (President)

Political
Vickers-Willis was a member of ARM aka the Australian Reform Movement. When he ran as s senate candidate for Victoria in the 1967 Australian Senate election,  his election platform was "Vote Us Out Of Vietnam".

Publications
 The Magic Of Life  
 Are You (really) Fun To Live With? 
 The Australian Standard Square Dance
 The War Diary

References

External links
 Official Website

1918 births
2008 deaths
People educated at Brighton Grammar School
20th-century Australian journalists
Royal Australian Air Force personnel of World War II
Australian World War II pilots
British emigrants to Australia
Military personnel from Middlesex
Liberal Reform Group politicians
Australian activists
Square dance